Anthony Pazos is a television personality, celebrity stylist, and entrepreneur from Los Angeles, California. He is most recognizably known for his work on WE tv's L.A. Hair, where he starred in four seasons and over 50 episodes, where the show ranked #1 in the female African American demographic. Some of his celebrity clientele include Beyoncé, Khloe Kardashian, Ashley Greene, and One Direction.

Early life 
Anthony Pazos comes from a diverse family; his father is Mexican-Peruvian and his mother is Bolivian-Welsh.  Anthony comes from a long line of Creatives and Artists.  He is the great-grandson of Peruvian Sculptor Carlos Pazos, known for his bronze bust made for President John F. Kennedy.

Growing up eating traditional dishes whipped up by his Peruvian grandfather, who was also a restaurateur. The 26-year-old described his family as “culturally diverse and loving.”

Career 
Anthony Pazos began his televised career at a very young age. His first television appearances were on the Style Network's 'Split Ends' and 'How Do I Look'.

Anthony's work has been featured in publications such as Allure, Vanity Fair, Glamour, Vogue Italia, Maxim, The Hollywood Reporter, Backstage, Wired, Venice, Fader and Curve magazines. Currently working as a freelancer, social media influencer, and salon owner, he divides his time between private clients, editorial shoots and film projects.

When asked about why he does hair, Anthony said, "My mission is not to simply make someone look 'pretty', but unveil their true beauty to the world. After sitting in my chair, no matter who you are or where you come from, you will leave feeling elevated and confident. I will incorporate your face shape, lifestyle, and personality to invigorate your look. When we look this good and feel this great, it's that much easier to live our dreams"

Throughout his career, Anthony has worked with such entertainers as Ashley Greene, the Kardashians, Leighton Meester, One Direction, among others.  Anthony worked alongside Beyonce Knowles for her 2016 VMA performance and her legendary Super Bowl 50 performance.

On his future plans, Anthony will be creating a docu-series reality show to follow up his experience on WETv's LA Hair, as well as starting an e-commerce store to ship personalized beauty products worldwide. His mission statement is always to create high-class products at an affordable price.

Anthony gives his expert style advice to publications such as Shape, Allure, and Redbook.

Anthony runs a successful hair and makeup agency where he sends talented artists to high-end events, like runway shows for Armani, Lafayette, and Saint John to name a few.

Personal life 
Born and raised in Torrance, CA, he graduated with an AA and license in cosmetology and began “popping around from studio to studio” in Beverly Hills. He finally settled in West Hollywood at his own private studio suite, where he sees celebrity clientele and creates digital media for high-end beauty organizations such as Coty, Inc and SalonCentric.

In 2011, Pazos rescued two pit bulls named Kenny Powers and Peanut Butter, and calls them, “the sweetest dogs ever.” He makes it a point to mention how inhumane many animals are being treated every day. He says he does not have any tolerance for it.

References

Living people
American hairdressers
American people of Mexican descent
Social media influencers
Year of birth missing (living people)